The 17th Gurkha Division/Overseas Commonwealth Land Forces (Malaya) was a British military formation that saw active service during the Malayan Emergency.

History
The Division was formed on 1 September 1952 at Maxwell Road Camp, Malaya, as part of the army response to the Malayan Emergency. It was a redesignation of Headquarters South Malaya District.

It perpetuated the traditions of the former 17th Indian Infantry Division which had used a Black Cat as its emblem.

Headquarters 17th Gurkha Division was the operational headquarters for all British and Gurkha units in Malaya. It controlled the 26th, 48th and 63rd Gurkha Brigades, and 99th Gurkha Brigade which formed about 1952 also came under command. Maxwell Road Camp was renamed Lamjung Camp in 1953.

In 1957, upon the Federation of Malaya gaining independence from British colonial rule, the Division was redesignated as the 17th Gurkha Division/Overseas Commonwealth Land Forces (Malaya).

It was based at Lamjung Camp in Kuala Lumpur until 1966 when it moved to Seremban where it remained until the Division disbanded in 1970. The final order of battle included 63rd and 99th Gurkha Brigades.

General Officers Commanding
Commanders included:
1952–1955 Major-General Lancelot Perowne
1955–1958 Major-General Richard Anderson
1958–1961 Major-General Jim Robertson
1961–1964 Major-General Walter Walker
1964–1965 Major-General Peter Hunt
1965–1969 Major-General Arthur Patterson
1969–1970 Major-General Derek Horsford

References

Bibliography
Pocock, Tom (1973). Fighting General – The Public & Private Campaigns of General Sir Walter Walker (First ed.). London: Collins. .

Infantry divisions of the United Kingdom
Military units and formations established in 1952
Military units and formations disestablished in 1970